The Brabham BT15 is a mid-engined open-wheel Formula 3 racing car, designed, developed, and built by Brabham between 1965 and 1966. 26 cars were built (though the records say 32 extra cars were built; this may be an error). It was powered by a naturally aspirated, Ford straight-four engine (the same type of engine used in the Ford Anglia).

References

Open wheel racing cars
Brabham racing cars
Formula Three cars
1960s cars
Cars of England